Macustus is a genus of true bugs belonging to the family Cicadellidae.

The species of this genus are found in Europe and Northern America.

Species:
 Macustus grisescens Zetterstedt, 1828

References

Cicadellidae
Hemiptera genera